All Saints' Church, Strelley is a Grade I listed parish church in the Church of England in Strelley, Nottinghamshire.

History
The church dates from the 13th century. It was rebuilt from 1356 by Samson de Strelley. The clerestory was added in the 15th century. It was restored between 1855 and 1856 by George Gordon Place and in 1895 by Charles Hodgson Fowler.

The clock in the tower was installed in 1868 and built by Reuben Bosworth.

Parish status 
This church is in a combined parish which comprises:
St John the Baptist's Church, Bilborough
St Martin of Tours’ Church, Bilborough

Memorials
The church is noted for its monuments which include:
Alabaster chest tomb to Sir Samson de Strelley and his wife, ca. 1400
Floor slab to John de Strelley, 1421
Brass to Sir Robert Strelley and his wife Isabel, 1487.
Alabaster chest tomb to John de Strelley, and his wife Sanchia, 1501.
Sir Nicholas de Strelley, 1560
Ralph Edge, 1684
William Taylor, 1696
Valentine Taylor, 1696
William Taylor, 1699
William Goodday, Rector, 1788, and his wife Ruth, 1766

References

Church of England church buildings in Nottinghamshire
Grade I listed churches in Nottinghamshire